Havant Academy is a mixed secondary school located in the Leigh Park area of Havant in the English county of Hampshire. The school is situated at the edge of Staunton Country Park.

Previously known as Wakeford Comprehensive School and latterly Staunton Park Community School, it gained specialist Sports College status and was renamed Staunton Community Sports College. It then became a foundation school administered by Hampshire County Council. The school converted to academy status on 1 September 2010 and was renamed Havant Academy, becoming the first academy in Hampshire. It is sponsored by the Kemnal Academies Trust.

Havant Academy was rated 'good' in most aspects in its Ofsted report of June 2015. In previous Ofsted reports Havant Academy had been found unsatisfactory; in 2013 Ofsted stated that "The academy is making reasonable progress towards the removal of special measures."

Havant Academy offers GCSEs, BTECs and other vocational courses as programmes of study for pupils.

Notable former pupils
Graham Stokes, music executive and musician

Notable former staff
Robert Kirby-Harris, Secretary General of the International Union of Pure and Applied Physics

References

External links
 

Secondary schools in Hampshire
Academies in Hampshire